The pre-season of the 2021–22 NBL season, the 44th season of Australia's National Basketball League, ran from 13 November 2021 to 28 November 2021.

Games

2021 NBL Blitz 

The NBL Blitz is an annual pre-season tournament featuring all NBL teams. This season games were held in New South Wales, Tasmania, and Victoria from the 13th to the 28th of November 2021. The league was separated into two conferences, with New South Wales and Victoria-based teams competing in Melbourne and Wollongong and all other teams competing in Hobart, Ulverstone and Launceston.

New South Wales/Victoria conference

Tasmania conference

Pre-season ladder

NBL Blitz ladder

References

Pre-season